Alias John Law is a 1935 American Western film directed by Robert N. Bradbury and starring Bob Steele. It was produced by Supreme Pictures and released by William Steiner Productions on a states-rights basis. It was remade in 1950 as West of the Brazos.

Cast 
 Bob Steele as Everett Tarkington 'John' Clark
 Roberta Gale as JoAnne Vallon
 Buck Connors as Bootch Collum
 Earl Dwire as The Kootney Kid, posing as Everett Tarkington Clark
 Robert McKenzie as Judge
 Steve Clark as Henchman Simi
 Jack Rockwell as Marshal Lamar Blyth
 Roger Williams as Sheriff
 Jack Cowell as Attorney Wagner

See also
 Bob Steele filmography

References

External links 
 
 

1935 films
1935 Western (genre) films
American Western (genre) films
American black-and-white films
1930s English-language films
Films directed by Robert N. Bradbury
1930s American films